Pensilvania (Spanish for Pennsylvania) is a town and municipality in the Colombian Department of Caldas.

Climate
Pensilvania has a subtropical highland climate (Cfb) with heavy to very heavy rainfall year-round.

References

Municipalities of Caldas Department